John C. Nivison is a United States magistrate judge of the United States District Court for the District of Maine and a former state court judge.

Education 

Nivison received his Bachelor of Arts from Colby College in 1982 and his Juris Doctor from the University of Maine School of Law in 1985.

Legal career 

From 1985–1999, Nivison worked in the Augusta office of Pierce Atwood before becoming a judge.

State court service 

From 1999–2007, Nivison served as a Judge of the Maine District Court after being appointed by Governor Angus King.  He served as Chief Judge from 2005–2007. On August 31, 2007, Nivson was nominated by Governor John Baldacci to serve as a Judge of the Maine Superior Court. On September 21, 2007, he was confirmed by the Maine Senate.

Federal judicial service

United States magistrate judge 

In September 2013, Nivison was selected to be a United States magistrate judge to replace Judge Margaret J. Kravchuk, who retired on January 24, 2014. He was sworn into office on January 27, 2014.

References

External links 

Year of birth uncertain
Place of birth missing (living people)
Living people
20th-century American lawyers
20th-century American judges
21st-century American judges
Colby College alumni
Maine lawyers
Maine state court judges
United States magistrate judges
University of Maine School of Law alumni
Year of birth missing (living people)